Luiz Gonzaga do Nascimento, Jr. (September 22, 1945 – April 29, 1991), better known as Gonzaguinha, in Portuguese Little Gonzaga, was a noted Brazilian singer and composer. He was born in Rio de Janeiro and he was the son of Luiz Gonzaga ('Gonzagão', 'Big Gonzaga'), the "king of baião". Gonzaguinha was killed in a car accident on April 29, 1991, in Renascença, state of Paraná, southern Brazil.

Many eminent Brazilian artists recorded his compositions, such as Maria Bethânia, Simone, Elis Regina, Fagner, and Joanna. Among these, stands out Simone and great hits like "Sangrando", "Mulher, e daí" and "Começaria tudo outra vez".

Death and legacy
Gonzaguinha died at the age of 45 on April 29, 1991, the victim of a car accident. Returning from a performance in Pato Branco, Paraná, the singer was driving a Chevrolet Monza around 7:20 am on a southwestern highway when he collided with a truck. Gonzaguinha was heading to Foz do Iguaçu. He was going to fly to Florianópolis, where he had a scheduled show.

Discography
 1970: Um abraço terno em você, viu mãe, Odeon;
 1973: Luiz Gonzaga Jr., Odeon;
 1974: Luiz Gonzaga Jr., EMI/Odeon;
 1975: Os senhores da terra, Museu da Imagem e do Som;
 1975: Plano de vôo, EMI/Odeon;
 1976: Começaria tudo outra vez, EMI/Odeon;
 1977: Moleque Gonzaguinha, EMI/Odeon;
 1978: Recado, EMI/Odeon;
 1979: Gonzaguinha da vida, EMI/Odeon;
 1980: De volta ao começo, EMI/Odeon;
 1980: Coisa mais maior de grande pessoa, EMI/Odeon;
 1981: A vida do viajante. Com Luiz Gonzaga, EMI/Odeon;
 1981: Coisa mais maior de grande pessoa, EMI/Odeon;
 1982: Caminhos do coração, EMI;
 1983: "Alô, alô Brasil", EMI/Odeon;
 1984: Grávido, EMI/Odeon;
 1985: Olho de lince/trabalho de parto, EMI/Odeon;
 1987: Geral, EMI/Odeon;
 1988: Corações marginais, Moleque/WEA;
 1990: Luizinho de Gonzaga, WEA/Moleque;
 1990: É, Capitol-EMI Music;
 1993: Cavaleiro solitário, Som Livre;
 2001: Luiz Gonzaga Jr. – Gonzaguinha, Universal Music.

Selection
 1991: Gonzagão & Gonzaguinha-Juntos, com Luiz Gonzaga, BMG/Ariola;
 1994: A viagem de Gonzagão e Gonzaguinha, com Luiz Gonzaga, EMI/Odeon;
 1994: O talento de Gonzaguinha, EMI/Odeon.

Tribute
 2001: Simples Saudade'', BMG Brasil.

References

External links
 Tributo a Gonzaguinha
 Música Brasileira

1945 births
1991 deaths
Brazilian composers
20th-century Brazilian male singers
20th-century Brazilian singers
Música Popular Brasileira singers
Musicians from Rio de Janeiro (city)
Road incident deaths in Brazil
20th-century composers